Group F of the EuroBasket 2011 took place between 8 to 12 September 2011. The group played all of its games at Siemens Arena in Vilnius, Lithuania.

The group composed of the three best ranked teams from groups C and D. The four teams with the best records advanced to the quarterfinals.

Standings

8 September

Georgia vs. Macedonia

Finland vs. Russia

Slovenia vs. Greece

10 September

Georgia vs. Finland

Macedonia vs. Slovenia

Greece vs. Russia

12 September

Slovenia vs. Finland

Greece vs. Georgia

Russia vs. Macedonia

External links
Standings and fixtures

FIBA EuroBasket 2011
2011–12 in Russian basketball
2011–12 in Republic of Macedonia basketball
2011–12 in Greek basketball
2011–12 in Slovenian basketball
2011 in Finnish sport
2011 in Georgian sport
Sports competitions in Vilnius
21st century in Vilnius